The bar-lipped sheen-skink (Eugongylus rufescens) is a species of lizard in the family Scincidae. It is found in Australia (Queensland), the Solomon Islands, Indonesia, and Admiralty Islands.

References

Eugongylus
Reptiles described in 1802
Taxa named by George Shaw